Ruzsky District is an administrative and municipal district (raion), one of the thirty-six in Moscow Oblast, Russia. It is located in the west of the oblast. Its administrative center is the town of Ruza. Population: 61,673 (2010 Census);  The population of Ruza accounts for 21.9% of the district's total population.

References

Notes

Sources

Districts of Moscow Oblast